The Certificate in Education and Training is an initial teacher training qualification, studied at Qualifications and Credit Framework Level 4, for teaching in Further Education and the lifelong learning sector of education in the United Kingdom. Study for the Certificate in Education and Training typically follows the completion of the Award in Education and Training at Qualifications and Credit Framework Level 3, and precedes the start of the Diploma in Education and Training at Level 5. The Certificate in Education and Training qualifies an associate teacher for Associate Teacher Learning and Skills status from the Institute for Learning. The Certificate in Education and Training replaces the Certificate in Teaching in the Lifelong Learning Sector.
The Certificate in Education and Training Level 4 is qualification for associate teacher. This does not allow one to apply for Qualified Teacher Learning and Skills. https://www.gov.uk/qualified-teacher-status-qts

Level 4 Certificate In Education and Training Level 4

References 

Educational qualifications in the United Kingdom
Professional certification in teaching
Teacher training